Zapata Air Force Station (ADC ID: TM-189) is a closed United States Air Force General Surveillance Radar station. It was closed in 1961.

History
Zapata Air Force Station came into existence as part of Phase III of the Air Defense Command Mobile Radar program. On
October 20, 1953 ADC requested a third phase of twenty-five radar sites be constructed.

The 742d Aircraft Control and Warning Squadron was assigned to the station by the 33d Air Division on 1 July 1957. It initially operated an AN/FPS-3A search radar and an AN/FPS-6 height-finder radar, and initially the station functioned as a Ground-Control Intercept (GCI) and warning station.  As a GCI station, the squadron's role was to guide interceptor aircraft toward unidentified intruders picked up on the unit's radar scopes.

In addition to the main facility, Zapata operated an AN/FPS-14 Gap Filler site:
 Delmita, TX      (TM-189A): 

The site was deactivated on 1 June 1961 due to budgetary constraints.  Today what was Zapata Air Force Station was sold to private ownership and the County of Zapata.  It is now known as the Laspalmas RV Park. After being sold, part of the base was divided into small lots and sold individually to private owners, who drive mobile trailers or campers to the lots and remain there through the winter months. The remainder of the site is vacant. It has reverted to, and is owned by, the county of Zapata.  Most of the buildings remain in use and the site is well-maintained.

Air Force units and assignments 
Units:
 742d Aircraft Control and Warning Squadron, Assigned 1 July 1957 to Zapata Air Force Station
 Activated by 33d AD at Oklahoma City AFS on 8 September 1956
 Discontinued on 1 June 1961

Assignments:
 33d Air Division, 1 July 1957
 Oklahoma City Air Defense Sector, 1 January 1960 – 1 June 1961

What was Zapata Air Force Station was sold to private ownership and the County of Zapata. Today it is known as the "HAWK BASE". After being bought by Mr.Roberto Lopez, Sr Founder, Owner and President of Hawk Oilfield Service, Inc.  Hawk Base serves as a central station to all Hawk satellite locations throughout south Texas.

See also
 List of USAF Aerospace Defense Command General Surveillance Radar Stations

References

  A Handbook of Aerospace Defense Organization 1946 - 1980,  by Lloyd H. Cornett and Mildred W. Johnson, Office of History, Aerospace Defense Center, Peterson Air Force Base, Colorado
 Winkler, David F. (1997), Searching the skies: the legacy of the United States Cold War defense radar program. Prepared for United States Air Force Headquarters Air Combat Command.
 Information for Zapata AFS, TX

Permanent System radar stations
Semi-Automatic Ground Environment sites
Installations of the United States Air Force in Texas
Military installations closed in 1961
1957 establishments in Texas
1961 disestablishments in Texas